Bad Boys Blue are the German pop group formed in Cologne in 1984. The group performed many international hits including "You're a Woman", "Pretty Young Girl", "I Wanna Hear Your Heartbeat", and "Come Back and Stay".

The group became massively popular in Eastern Europe, South America, and South Africa, with the band performing to sell-out crowds in Russia and Ukraine. In contrast, the group never charted in the UK, and their only charting U.S. singles were "Save Your Love" and "I Totally Miss You" (1993) which became successful chart hits.

History

1980s 
Bad Boys Blue was formed in the summer of 1984 by German producer Tony Hendrik and his lyricist wife Karin van Haaren. The original trio consisted of singers Trevor "Supa T" Taylor from Jamaica (the original lead vocalist), John McInerney from the UK, and Andrew Thomas from the US. Their debut single "L.O.V.E. in My Car" failed to make an impression in the pop charts but the follow-up "You're a Woman" was a success, reaching the top 10 in many European countries.

1990s 

The group has experienced numerous line-up changes. In 1988, Trevor Taylor left the group a year after being gradually demoted from his role of the lead singer. He was asked to rejoin the group the following year just for recording sessions for the "Hungry for Love" single that was to be featured on the group's first compilation album Bad Boys Best. Trevor Taylor's departure permanently secured John McInerney's position as the band's new lead vocalist. Trevor Taylor was replaced by Trevor Bannister (born 5 August 1965 in Grimsby, England), whose function in the group was mainly to perform Trevor Taylor's hits in live gigs. It is during Bannister's tenure with the band that Bad Boys Blue began touring in Eastern Europe thus gaining much popularity there. Trevor Bannister left in 1993 and the remaining two members performed as a duo. During its entire South African tour, the duo was briefly joined by Owen Standing, who left the group shortly thereafter, and therefore was not considered to be a permanent band member. Multi-talented Irmo Russel (born 15 March 1956 in Aruba, Caribbean Sea) joined the group in 1995, who in addition to stepping into Bannister's shoes was instrumental in revitalizing the group's creative potential, by becoming a composer, video director, and occasionally assuming the role of lead singer on some of the tracks. At the end of 1999, Kevin McCoy (stage name JoJo Max) replaced Irmo Russel by joining Bad Boys Blue full-time after being the group's rapper since 1998, but left in early 2003 leaving Bad Boys Blue as a duo again. However, in 2005, Kevin McCoy rejoined Andrew Thomas' Bad Boys Blue line-up.

2000s 

In 2005, McInerney and Thomas split under less than amicable circumstances. Andrew Thomas went on to form an all-American version of Bad Boys Blue with former member Kevin McCoy and new lead singer (no relation), and they were said to be working on a new release, with Kevin McCoy being the trio's producer. Andrew Thomas' formation of the band was named "The Real Bad Boys Blue". Their shows were based on the full playback including original music produced by original producers, lead vocals by John McInerney and backing vocals by studio session singers.

John McInerney kept performing as Bad Boys Blue; at first he performed solo with a live group and backing singers but in the following year he was joined by Carlos Ferreira (born 11 April 1969 in Mozambique), and this presently UK-based duo set out to work on a new album, with the French producers MS Project.

Trevor Taylor, the original lead singer of Bad Boys Blue, died of a heart attack in his home in Cologne on 19 January 2008 at the age of 50.

Bad Boys Blue, in May 2008, released a brand new album called Heart & Soul with 13 new original songs. The album was supported by the release of two maxi-singles: "Still in Love" and "Queen of My Dreams". In May 2009 this formation resumed cooperation with its original label, Coconut Music, in addition to working with its current production team.

The Real Bad Boys Blue, in June 2008, experienced significant changes in personnel. This formation was essentially split in two when Herb McCoy left the group to continue performing solo, but under his own name, using his own versions of some Bad Boys Blue songs. At the same time, Kevin McCoy became the new lead singer of the remaining duo, and a new member, Jeremy Cummins, was added to this group's line-up. This version of the group completed recording of several brand new tracks, all penned and sung by Kevin McCoy.

On 19 June 2009 Coconut Music/Sony Music released a special remix album titled Rarities Remixed. The album contained modern remixes of some hit singles and album tracks.

On 21 July 2009 Andrew Thomas died in Cologne at the age of 63. John McInerney is now the only member alive from the original line-up of Bad Boys Blue.

On 30 October 2009 Coconut Music/Sony BMG released a special compilation titled "Unforgettable". The item was dedicated to both original members of Bad Boys Blue who died, Trevor Taylor and Andrew Thomas.

2010s 

On 13 August 2010 Coconut Music/Modern Romantics Productions/Sony Music released the anniversary single titled "Come Back and Stay Re-Recorded 2010" including remixes produced by MS Project, Alex Twister, Spinnin Elements & Almighty. On 27 August 2010 the said labels released the anniversary album titled 25 including 25 re-recorded hits, 7 brand new remixes plus a bonus DVD.

In September 2011, John has made the decision to finish working with Carlos.

In October 2011, the group was joined by Kenny "Krayzee" Lewis, known from collaboration with C.C.Catch, Touché, and Mark 'Oh.

Late in the year 2011, John has made the decision to finish working with "Krayzee".

On 21 September 2012 Coconut Music released a DVD titled Live On TV.

In December 2013, Bad Boys Blue announced on their Facebook page that they are working on a new album. Some of the songs are already completed and the remainder will be complete by January/February 2014. Some of the songwriters will be: Pawel Marciniak, Mattias Canerstam and Johann Perrier.

In June 2015, Bad Boys Blue released a new album titled 30. It contains four new and four unreleased songs, along with some remixes of older songs.

Line-ups

Discography 

 Hot Girls, Bad Boys (1985)
 Heartbeat (1986)
 Love Is No Crime (1987)
 My Blue World (1988)
 The Fifth (1989)
 Game of Love (1990)
 House of Silence (1991)
 Totally (1992)
 Kiss (1993)
 To Blue Horizons (1994)
 Bang Bang Bang (1996)
 Back (1998)
 ...Continued (1999)
 Follow the Light (1999)
 Tonite (2000)
 Around the World (2003)
 Heart & Soul (2008)
 25 (The 25th Anniversary Album) (2010)
 30 (2015)
 Heart & Soul (Recharged) (2018)
 Tears Turning To Ice (2020)

Citations

External links 

 
 

German pop music groups
Dance-pop groups
Eurodisco groups
Sony BMG artists
Musical groups from Cologne
Musical groups established in 1984
1984 establishments in Germany